Elk Mountain is a  mountain summit located in Flathead County in the U.S. state of Montana. It is situated in the southern tip of Glacier National Park, in the Lewis Range, about four miles to the west side of the Continental Divide. US Highway 2 and the Hi-Line Subdivision of the BNSF Railway traverse the southern base of this mountain, approximately four miles west of Marias Pass. The nearest higher neighbor is Sheep Mountain 2.7 miles to the north-northwest. The mountain's name first appeared on a 1914 USGS map, and was officially adopted in 1929 by the United States Board on Geographic Names. The summit is the site of a former fire lookout that was built in the 1930s, and removed in 1963.

Geology 

Like other mountains in Glacier National Park, Elk Mountain is composed of sedimentary rock laid down during the Precambrian to Jurassic periods.

Climate 
According to the Köppen climate classification system, Elk Mountain is located in an alpine subarctic climate zone with long, cold, snowy winters, and cool to warm summers. Winter temperatures can drop below −10 °F with wind chill factors below −30 °F. Due to its altitude, it receives precipitation all year, as snow in winter, and as thunderstorms in summer. Precipitation runoff from the mountain drains into Autumn and Ole Creeks, which are both tributaries of Middle Fork Flathead River. This climate supports a Lodgepole pine forest on its lower slopes.

See also
 Mountains and mountain ranges of Glacier National Park (U.S.)
 Geology of the Rocky Mountains

References

External links
 Elk Mountain trail: Enjoyyourparks.com
 Elk Mountain trail: Hikingproject.com

Mountains of Flathead County, Montana
Mountains of Glacier National Park (U.S.)
Lewis Range
Mountains of Montana
North American 2000 m summits